A bashlyk, also spelled bashlik (Adyghe: Shkharkhon, Abkhaz: qtarpá, Chechen: Ċukkuiy, Ossetic: Kaskæ , Tatar: Başlıq, Turkish: Başlık; "baş" - head, "-lıq" (Tatar) / "-lık" (Turkish) - derivative suffix), is a traditional Turkic, Caucasian, Iranian, and Cossack cone-shaped headdress hood, usually of leather, felt or wool, an ancient round topped felt bonnet with lappets for wrapping around the neck. Local versions determine the trim, which may consist of decorative cords, embroidery, jewelry, metallized strings, fur balls or tassels. Among dozens of versions are winter bashlyks worn atop regular headdress, cotton bashlyks, homeknitted bashlyks, silk bashlyks, scarf bashlyks, down bashlyks, dress bashlyks, jumpsuit-type bashlyks, etc. Bashlyks are used as traditional folk garment, and as uniform headdress. 

A variation of bashlyks is a Kalpak (Qalpaq), a cone-shaped headdress without lappets, mostly made of leather, felt or wool, as depicted in the Repin's painting below. "Kalpak" is also a component of the ethnic name "Kara-Kalpak" (literally "a black kalpak" in Turkic), known from the history of the medieval Eastern Europe, and from the modern Karakalpak autonomous republic in the western Syr Darya - Amu Darya interfluve in Uzbekistan, north of the ancient Balkh. 

In modern times, bashlyks became fashionable in Russia in  1830-1840, after the Napoleonic War with significant participation of the Bashkir cavalry. By the 1862 bashlyks were made a uniform headdress in Cossack armies, and later in other branches of Russian armed forces. The military bashlyk was bright yellow camel wool, with a yellow band. Officer bashlyks had gold or silver band. In Russian army bashlyks lasted till 1917, when they became a trademark of White Army uniform, and some White Army troops have the lappets tucked into the belt on the front instead of wrapping around the neck.

Gallery

See also
Budenovka
Kalpak
Kausia
Phrygian cap

References

Military equipment of Russia
Military uniforms
Military history of Russia
Russian clothing
Turkish words and phrases
Hoods (headgear)
Ottoman clothing
Iranian clothing
Achaemenid Empire
Pointed hats